Elliott Gould is an American actor.

He is known for his performances in film such as Bob & Carol & Ted & Alice (1969), M*A*S*H (1970), The Long Goodbye (1973), California Split (1974), A Bridge Too Far (1977), American History X (1998), the Ocean's film franchise (2001, 2004, 2007, 2018), Contagion (2011), and Ruby Sparks (2012).

He is also known for his performances in television shows such as Friends, Ray Donovan, Mulaney, Grace and Frankie, and The Kominsky Method.

Filmography

Film

Sources: Turner Classic Movies

Television

Video games

 Theatre Sources: Playbill and IBDB'''

External links

References 

American filmographies
Male actor filmographies